The minister for the Federal Economic Development Initiative for Northern Ontario—previously the Minister of State responsible for the Federal Economic Development Initiative for Northern Ontario—is the minister in the Canadian Cabinet who also serves as the chief executive of Federal Economic Development Initiative for Northern Ontario (FedNor). Since 2015, the Minister of Economic Development and Official Languages is ex officio the Minister responsible for FedNor.

The post is traditionally held by a member of parliament from Northern Ontario, although occasionally the responsibilities have been accorded to a more senior cabinet minister, such as the Industry Minister (in the case of Tony Clement). 

Related regional development posts include the Minister for the Atlantic Canada Opportunities Agency, the Minister of the Economic Development Agency of Canada for the Regions of Quebec and the Minister for Western Economic Diversification.

This position was not a full cabinet portfolio, and was thus initially styled as the Secretary of State for the Federal Economic Development Initiative for Northern Ontario between 1999 and 2003. The subsequent ministers were styled as Minister of State responsible for the Federal Economic Development Initiative for Northern Ontario. As of November 2015, FedNor and all other regional development agencies no longer have individual ministers and all are overseen by the Minister of Economic Development and Official Languages (previously, Minister of Innovation, Science and Economic Development).

, the current Minister responsible for the Federal Economic Development Initiative for Northern Ontario is Patty Hajdu.

Ministers
Key:

References 

Federal Economic Development Initiative for Northern Ontario